{{Infobox television
| image                = Call Me by Fire official poster.jpg
| caption              = 
| native_name          = 
| genre                = Reality
| presenter            = Liu Tao
| country              = China
| language             = Mandarin
| num_seasons          = 1
| num_episodes         = 12
| camera               = Multi-camera
| runtime              = 94–208 minutes
| network              = Mango TV
| picture_format       = HDTV 1080i
| audio_format         = Stereophonic
| released             = 
| last_aired           = 
| related              = Sisters Who Make WavesBoyhood (哥哥的少年时代) (定义) (大湾仔的夜) (我们的滚烫人生)
| followed_by          = Call Me by Fire (season 2) (2022)}}Call Me by Fire is a 2021 Chinese singing reality television show broadcast on Mango TV. It features 33 male celebrities who have been in the entertainment industry for close to ten years or more competing to form a 17-member performance group. The show aired from August 12 to October 29, 2021, with 12 episodes in total.

It is a spin-off of the well-received Sisters Who Make Waves, which featured a similar premise with female celebrities. Both shows followed in the footsteps of trending idol group audition programs like Produce 101 and Idol Producer, with Call Me by Fire aiming to put together a range of experienced male entertainers and provide them opportunities to collaborate on stage.

Aside from the main episodes, there are also special "Plus" episodes that can be accessed through paid subscription to Mango TV, featuring additional behind-the-scenes footage not aired in the main show.

Format 
The competition is carried out through a series of concerts, with the contestants performing in groups. Depending on the round's specific rules, the audience and a panel of industry experts vote for their favourite group performances and/or individual contestants. The resulting rankings determine which contestants are eliminated and/or how groupings are shuffled. Voting scores are also tabulated as "firepower," which acts as currency for contestant groups during bidding for the following concert's song selection and performance order. 

The show opened with a "Premiere Concert" introducing the 33 contestants. This was followed by five rounds with different groupings and concert themes. At the end of the fifth round, the remaining 22 contestants competed in a final "Family Formation Night" concert that determined the successful members of the ultimate 17-member performance group.  

Aside from segments related to the formal competition such as rehearsals and bidding, the show also features contestants' dormitory life and informal group activities like a talent show or cook-off.

Contestants 
The contestants' names within both the English and Chinese language entertainment industries are shown. Top 17 contestants will debut as a group on the show's finale.

Synopsis

Premiere Concert
Theme: The First Meeting, Pleased to Meet You

The contestants are introduced to the rules and to one another. They are then assigned to groups of similar skills for their first introductory performances. Each group stage featured short individual performances of different songs, with the final song continuing into a full group performance to end off. After each stage, the audience voted for their favourite member in the group, with the top-ranking member gaining 100 firepower for the next round. After all 8 group stages, the 33 contestants performed a closing song together. 

This premiere concert was hosted by  alongside three contestants from Sisters Who Make Waves: Baby Zhang and Shen Mengchen from Season 1, and Yang Yuying from Season 2.

First Performance
Theme: Outer Space Message Board

The contestants are split into 8 tribes with three to five members each, named after the respective tribe leader. Every tribe performed one song in the concert, with the two lowest-ranking tribes having to select one member to transfer out to another tribe.

Second Performance
Theme: The 25th Hour

In this round, tribes had to form an alliance with a second tribe to perform one "Vocal" category song and one "Perform" category song together. A limit of six performers per song was imposed. The voting scores for both songs were combined, with the lowest-ranking alliance having to select three members to send home.

Third Performance
Theme: Wait for Me to Find You

The alliances of the previous round were dissolved and the eight tribes reorganised into four larger camps, named after the respective camp leader. Like the previous round, each camp had to perform one "Vocal" category song and one "Perform" category song. However, this round was conducted in two halves, with two camps competing directly in each half. Audience and expert panel voting determined the losing camp of each half, as well as the individual contestant ranking in each camp. The losing camp would then have to vote within itself to eliminate one of its three lowest-ranking members.

Fourth Performance 
Theme: Thirty Thousand Days

Continuing with the camps from the previous round, this round was further divided into three showdowns featuring solo, duet and full camp performances. Only the camp with the top overall ranking would be safe from elimination and proceed to the next round without reshuffling members. Meanwhile, the four lowest-ranking members across the remaining three camps were sent home.

Fifth Performance
Theme: Another Me in this World

The final group reshuffle occurred at the start of this round to form two main camps: "Qilin (麒麟) Camp" and "One Flower (一枝花) Camp," led by Nathan Lee and Max Zhang respectively. The two camps faced off in three group rounds, with members allowed to participate in only one performance each. One elimination slot was added each time a camp lost a group round, with the lowest-ranking member(s) in that camp filling in the slot(s) to be sent home.

Family Formation Night
This last competition stage to determine the winning members of the ultimate 17-member "Singing Family" was held in three rounds. The Qilin and One Flower Camps were maintained, with the winning camp gaining 3 Family slots in the first two rounds and 5 Family slots in the third round. These 11 slots were filled based on the individual member rankings in each camp. The last 6 Family slots were awarded to the 6 highest-ranking contestants from the remaining 11 without considering their camp. 

Two special titles were also awarded:

 "X-Fire" — top-ranking member of each camp
 "X-Leader" — the leader of the camp with the higher total number of performance votes at the end of the night was crowned leader of the Family

The concert also featured special celebratory performances by guests and eliminated contestants.

Results 
The contestants' names within both the English and Chinese language entertainment industries are shown. Top 17 contestants will debut as a group on the show's finale.

Spin-offs 
Two spin-off shows aired concurrently with Call Me by Fire, featuring various contestants: Brothers' Boyhood (哥哥的少年时代) put contestants in a schoolroom setting to play various games, while Definition (定义) served as a talkshow with sit-down interviews. 

Cooking reality show  (大湾仔的夜) premiered in November 2021, shortly after the final episode of Call Me by Fire, featuring Jordan Chan, Julian Cheung, Michael Tse, Jerry Lamb and Edmond Leung. These five Hong Kong celebrities were known informally as the "Greater Bay Brothers" after forming the "Jordan Chan tribe" in the First Performance round. They were tasked with running a small eatery modelled after dai pai dong, an iconic part of Hong Kong food culture.

In December 2021, another spin-off show  (我们的滚烫人生) began airing, featuring various contestants such as Jordan Chan, Julian Cheung, Max Zhang, Welly Zhang and Nathan Lee. The cast experienced six different ordinary yet extraordinary professions such as firefighting and teaching, with each visit ending with a live concert to thank and celebrate the people in each profession.

Notes

References 

Singing talent shows
Chinese music television series
Mandopop
2021 Chinese television series debuts
Chinese television shows
Mandarin-language television shows
2021 in Chinese music
Hunan Broadcasting System original programming
Mango TV original programming